Spring Dale, also known as Springdale and David S. McGavock House, is a historic home and national historic district located near Dublin, Pulaski County, Virginia. It encompasses five contributing buildings and the Samuel Cecil Archeological Site. The main house was built in 1856–1857, and is a two-story, nearly square, Gothic Revival style brick mansion. James C. Deyerle is credited with early construction. It has a double pile, central-hall plan and shallow hipped roof.  Also on the property are the contributing brick smokehouse, a frame barn, a frame chicken coop, and a log structure that may have served as a blacksmith shop. The Samuel Cecil Archeological Site consists of the ruins of the log house built by Samuel Cecil in 1768.

It was added to the National Register of Historic Places in 2003.

References

Archaeological sites on the National Register of Historic Places in Virginia
Historic districts in Pulaski County, Virginia
Gothic Revival architecture in Virginia
Houses in Pulaski County, Virginia
National Register of Historic Places in Pulaski County, Virginia
Historic districts on the National Register of Historic Places in Virginia